Northeast Division may refer to:

Northeast Division (NHL)
Northeast Division (PIHA)
Northeast Division Board